Michel-Philippe Bouvart (Chartres, 11 January 1717 – Paris, 19 January 1787) was a French medical doctor.

Louis XV granted him letters of nobility and the Order of St. Michael in 1768 or 1769.

Bouvart was famous for his quick diagnoses and accurate prognoses, but also for his caustic wit and polemical writing against his fellow physicians, notably Théodore Tronchin, Théophile de Bordeu, Antoine Petit. He was opposed to inoculation against smallpox. He championed Virginia polygala or Seneka as a remedy for snakebite.

Although he was able and learned, he is perhaps best known for his witticisms.

Witticisms

Variants of Bouvart's quip about the placebo effect of using a new treatment or medicine "while it still works" are often quoted without crediting him.

A "regular prelate" (prélat régulier) is a high-ranking churchman; this is a play on words, implying that he was irregular, that is, immoral. Abbot Terray is Joseph Marie Terray.

This story has been compared to Euricius Cordus's epigram:

Early life

Bouvart's father Claude was a physician.  Michel-Philippe received his medical degree in Reims in 1730 and practiced in Chartres. In 1736, he left for Paris.

Bibliography
 Antoine Jean Baptiste Maclou Guenet, Éloge historique de Michel-Philippe Bouvart, chez Quillau, Paris, 1787 full text
 Nicolas de Condorcet, Éloge de M. Bouvart, dans Éloges des académiciens de l'Académie royale des sciences, morts depuis l'an 1783, chez Frédéric Vieweg, Brunswick et Paris, 1799,  full text
 Dezobry et Bachelet, Dictionnaire de biographie 1 Delagrave, 1876, p. 359
 Jean Baptiste Glaire, vicomte , Joseph Chantrel, Encyclopédie catholique, 1842 full text.
 Bibliothèque chartraine, dans Mémoires de la Société archéologique de l'Orléanais 19:51-53, 1883 full text

Notes

18th-century French physicians
Members of the French Academy of Sciences
Academic staff of the Collège de France
Academic staff of the University of Paris
1717 births
1787 deaths
Professional humor